Mariano Ramón Toedtli Leones (born 23 March 1976) is an Argentine former footballer who played as a striker.

He spent most of his professional career in Spain, in a spell which spanned an entire decade.

Club career
Born in Córdoba, Córdoba Province, Toedtli began playing football with Club Atlético Douglas Haig and Club Cipolletti, reaching the Primera División in 1998 with Club Atlético Huracán. After a sole season in Portugal with C.S. Marítimo he moved to Spain where he would remain for an entire decade, starting with UD Salamanca where he scored 16 goals in 2000–01 – fourth-best in the Segunda División – for a final ninth place.

Toedtli's only La Liga experience came with Sevilla FC. In his two years with the team he was almost always a backup, but he did net twice in a 3–0 away win against FC Barcelona on 15 December 2002, as the side went on to finish in tenth position.

Toedtli then had a brief passage at Recreativo de Huelva, spending the next four years with Polideportivo Ejido also in Andalusia, where he was a very important attacking unit as the club constantly managed to avoid relegation, until it befell in the 2007–08 campaign. After that, he moved down to the Segunda División B but stayed in the region, helping Cádiz CF to promote in 2009.

Toedtli scored five goals in 29 games in 2009–10, but Cádiz were immediately relegated. He retired in July 2010 at the age of 34, having appeared in 243 games in the Spanish second tier (60 goals).

In January 2021, Toedtli joined his compatriot Gabriel Heinze's coaching staff at Major League Soccer side Atlanta United FC.

References

External links
 

1976 births
Living people
Argentine people of Italian descent
Sportspeople from Córdoba Province, Argentina
Argentine footballers
Association football forwards
Argentine Primera División players
Primera Nacional players
Club Atlético Douglas Haig players
Club Atlético Huracán footballers
Primeira Liga players
C.S. Marítimo players
La Liga players
Segunda División players
Segunda División B players
UD Salamanca players
Sevilla FC players
Recreativo de Huelva players
Polideportivo Ejido footballers
Cádiz CF players
Argentine expatriate footballers
Expatriate footballers in Portugal
Expatriate footballers in Spain
Argentine expatriate sportspeople in Portugal
Argentine expatriate sportspeople in Spain
Argentine expatriate sportspeople in the United States